Summit Circle is a 2007 French-Canadian feature from Bernard Émond. The second in his trilogy of films on the Christian virtues of faith, hope and charity, which began with The Novena (La Neuvaine) in 2005 and concluded with The Legacy (La Donation) in 2009. It was screened at the 2007 Toronto International Film Festival.

Synopsis
Réjeanne (Guylaine Tremblay) is a switchboard operator whose life is thrown into turmoil when her husband, Gilles (Guy Jodoin), suffers an apparent debilitating stroke. The film transpires in the past and the present, as a police officer (René-Daniel Dubois) in the latter tries to solve Gilles's suspicious death (did Réjeanne kill her husband or not?), while the former shows the deterioration of the couple's marriage. A sparse, deliberately paced film, shot in a cinéma-vérité style that continues director Bernard Émond's exploration of the theological themes of faith, hope and charity.

Critical response 
"Summit Circle, with its deliberate, undifferentiated calmness, is a prime example of soporific filmmaking, not because it's dull (it's not) but because it's determined that no outbursts, whether of joy or sorrow, will muss up the benumbing tranquility. A little shake-up would have gone a long way toward making this tragedy a more affecting work." –Variety 
"Contre toute espérance is a movie one lives instead of watches. It affirms Émond's position as one of Canada's – and the world's — great humanist filmmakers."

Awards 
Prix Jutra – Best Actress (Guylaine Tremblay)

References

External links

2007 films
Films directed by Bernard Émond
Canadian drama films
French-language Canadian films
2000s Canadian films